Aqdash (also Romanized as Āqdāsh) is a village in Mehraban-e Olya Rural District, Shirin Su District, Kabudarahang County, Hamadan Province, Iran. At the 2006 census, its population was 252, in 51 families.

References 

Populated places in Kabudarahang County